Casalbordino (Abruzzese:) is a comune (municipality) and coastal town on the Adriatic Sea, within the Province of Chieti of the Abruzzo region of central-eastern Italy.

Physical geography
It is located about 6 km from the Adriatic coast, on a hill bordered by the Osento and Sinello rivers. It has a sand beach of 7.5 km long.

Origin of the name
The name is said to date back to a leader of that period named Roberto Bordinus, who captained the garrison in defense of the monastery. Casal, the farmhouse is a small area of dwellings that guarded the monastery. It was developed from an ancient tower and later became the fortified center.

Traditions
Feast of Our Lady of Miracles, year 2018
Casalbordino is particularly linked to the appearance of the so-called "Madonna dei Miracoli" which took place in 1576 in front of the peasant Alessandro Muzii, who prayed to the Virgin Mary during a storm to avoid destruction of his farm. The pilgrimage and devotion soon crossed the Casalese border, and extended throughout Abruzzo, so much so that at the time of D'Annunzio, the turnout had reached considerable proportions, during the days of 10 and 11 June. The tradition of miracles and graces granted by the Madonna to the sick, the infirm and the unfortunate, is well documented, and still continues today, according to testimonies of graces obtained by the Madonna.

The current festival takes place on the 10th and 11th days: on the first day the statue of the Madonna is carried in triumph from the sanctuary to the village of Casalbordino, after the holy masses, the adoration of the votive icon at the head of the altar, and the recitation of the Rosary, with the blessing of the final statue. The second day takes place with the civil program, which includes fairs, markets and the grand final concert.

Economy
The economy of the place is mainly agricultural (olive trees and vineyards), but since the 19th-century, sacred tourism has been of considerable importance due to the presence of the sanctuary of the Miracles. In recent times, seaside tourism is also flourishing, thanks to the presence of fine sand beaches named Lido di Casalbordino and the proximity of the Punta Aderci guided nature reserve.

In the coastal municipal area, the so-called "hard" ones of Casalbordino are preserved, a protected natural place where the species of the fratino nests, also characteristic is the beach of Santo Stefano locality, on the border with the Osento river. Casalbordino Lido-Termini, on the other hand, is a small village also equipped with a church for the bathing establishments. At Termini there is the Bosco Collerusci nature reserve.

References

Cities and towns in Abruzzo
Coastal towns in Abruzzo